Live at the New Empowering Church is a 2014 album by London-based band Melt Yourself Down. It was recorded live at The New Empowering Church in Hackney, London, and was released as part of Record Store Day 2014. It features seven tracks from the group's debut album Melt Yourself Down and was released exclusively on vinyl with only 900 copies available worldwide. The line-up on this record sees saxophonist Shabaka Hutchings and bassist Ruth Goller replaced by Wayne Francis and Leon Brichard respectively.
The Leaf Label later released this record on CD, combined with the band's debut record, for a special North American release.

Track listing
 "We Are Enough" – 5:58
 "Tuna" – 6:00
 "Mouth to Mouth" – 4:25
 "Kingdom of Kush" – 7:03
 "Camel" – 7:41
 "Fix My Life" – 4:13
 "Release!" – 4:24

Personnel
Pete Wareham – tenor saxophone
Kushal Gaya – vocals
Tom Skinner – drums
Satin Singh – percussion
Wayne Francis – tenor saxophone
Leon Brichard – bass guitar

References

2014 live albums
Melt Yourself Down albums